The Hudson County Interscholastic League (formerly known as the Hudson County Interscholastic Athletic Association) is a New Jersey high school sports association operating under the jurisdiction of the New Jersey State Interscholastic Athletic Association (NJSIAA)and consisting of public and parochial high schools in Hudson County. The Hudson County Interscholastic Athletic Association was in hiatus for the 2009-10 school year, as all schools played in the temporary North Jersey Tri-County Conference, where they were joined with the non-Hudson County schools from the former Northern New Jersey Interscholastic League.

Sports 
Fall Sports: Cross Country*, Football, Girls' Tennis, Soccer*, Volleyball
Winter Sports: Basketball*, Swimming*, Track & Field*, Wrestling, Bowling*
Spring Sports: Baseball, Boys' Tennis, Golf*, Softball, Track & Field*

(*)Sport is offered to both boys and girls.

Schools
Bayonne High School Bees, Bayonne
William L. Dickinson High School Rams, Jersey City
James J. Ferris High School Bulldogs, Jersey City
Hoboken High School Redwings, Hoboken
Holy Family Academy Falcons, Bayonne (Closed 2013)
Hudson Catholic Regional High School Hawks, Jersey City
Kearny High School Kardinals, Kearny
Lincoln High School Lions, Jersey City
Marist High School Royal Knights/Lady Knights, Bayonne
Dr. Ronald E. McNair Academic High School Cougars, Jersey City
Memorial High School Tigers, West New York
North Bergen High School Bruins, North Bergen
St. Anthony High School Friars, Jersey City (Closed 2017)
Saint Dominic Academy Blue Devils, Jersey City
St. Peter's Preparatory School Marauders, Jersey City
Henry Snyder High School Tigers, Jersey City
Union City High School Soaring Eagles, Union City
University Academy Charter High School, Jersey City

References

External links
New Jersey State Interscholastic Athletic Association

New Jersey high school athletic conferences
Sports in Hudson County, New Jersey